The 1877 Montgomery Boroughs by-election was fought on 15 May 1877.  The byelection was fought due to the succession to a peerage of the incumbent Liberal MP, Hon. Charles Hanbury-Tracy.  It was won by the Liberal candidate Hon. Frederick Hanbury-Tracy who was a lieutenant-colonel in the Worcester Yeomanry.

References

1877 in Wales
1870s elections in Wales
Montgomeryshire
1877 elections in the United Kingdom
By-elections to the Parliament of the United Kingdom in Welsh constituencies